Atilia (sometimes spelt Attilia) was the first wife of Marcus Porcius Cato Uticensis and mother of his two eldest children.

Biography

Early life
It is not known for certain who Atilia's father was, but he was from the Atilii Serrani. He may have been Gaius Atilius Serranus the consul of 106 BC, or Gaius' son.

Marriage
Cato married Atilia c. 73 BC, after his intended wife, Aemilia Lepida married Quintus Caecilius Metellus Pius Scipio Nasica.

In the words of Plutarch:
[Atilia] was the first woman with whom he made love, but not the only one, as was true of Laelius, the friend of Scipio Africanus; Laelius, indeed, was more fortunate, since in the course of his long life he only ever made love to one woman, the wife of his youth.

Cato and Atilia had a son Marcus Porcius Cato, who later died in the second Battle of Philippi, and a daughter Porcia, who became the wife of her cousin Marcus Junius Brutus.

Circa 63 BC, Cato divorced Atilia on the grounds of her unseemly behaviour, later marrying Marcia. Atilia is not mentioned again.

Family tree

Notes 

1st-century BC Roman women
1st-century BC Romans
Atilii
Cato the Younger